Whitharral (pronounced "WHIT-hair-ul", the T and H do not blend) is an unincorporated community in Hockley County, Texas, United States.

History
Whitharral was founded in 1924 after the sale of the Littlefield ranchlands. The town was named for John Whitfield Harral, a trustee of the Yellow House Land Company, which sold the Littlefield ranchlands to farmers.

A school was founded in 1925, and a post office the following year. Cotton gins, three churches, a garage, and a general store followed soon after.

Tornadoes have hit the town twice. The first occurred on Easter Sunday of 1957, causing some residential damage.  Late in the evening on April 17, 1970, a violent tornado caused heavy damage to parts of the city and flattened the school's gym just minutes after fans and players had left the facility.

Education
The Whitharral Independent School District serves area students. The high school football team has played in the UIL six-man football state championship three times, winning in 1981 and 2001.

On March 2, 2013, the Whitharral girls basketball team, the Lady Panthers, captured the Class 1A Division II state championship by defeating Saltillo of Hopkins County, Texas.

See also
Llano Estacado
West Texas
U.S. Route 385
Pep, Texas

References

External links

Public domain photos of the Llano Estacado

Unincorporated communities in Texas
Unincorporated communities in Hockley County, Texas